Robert Chaudenson (12 April 1937 – 7 April 2020) was a French linguist.

Biography
He was a specialist in creole languages and an emeritus professor of linguistics at the University of Provence. He was a widely known author on the subject of creolistics and president of the International Committee of Creole Studies. He was born in Lyon, and died aged 82, just 5 days before his 83rd birthday in Metropolitan France due to complications of COVID-19.

Publications
1974. Le lexique du parler créole de la Réunion, 2 vol., Paris: Champion, 1249 p.
1978. "Créole et langage enfantin: phylogenèse et ontogenèse", Langue française, vol. 37, pp. 76–90.
1979. "A propos de la genèse du créole mauricien: le peuplement de l'Ile de France de 1721 à 1735", Etudes Créoles, 1979, n° 1, pp. 43–57.
1990. "Recherche, formation et créolistique", Revue Québecoise de linguistique théorique et appliquée, vol. 9, n°3, novembre 1990, pp. 287–303.
1992. "Les langues créoles", La Recherche, n° 248, novembre 1992, pp. 1248–1256.
1994. "Français d'Amérique du Nord et créoles français : le français parlé par les immigrants du XVIIème siècle", in R. Mougeon et E. Beniak (ed.), Les origines du français québecois, Presses de l'Université Laval, pp. 169–180.
1995. "Les français d'Amérique ou le français d'Amérique : genèse et comparaison" in H. Wittmann  et R. Fournier" (ed.), Le français des Amériques, Presses universitaires de Trois-Rivières, pp. 3–19.
1998a. (with L.J. Calvet),   Saint-Barthélemy : une énigme linguistique, Paris: Didier Erudition, 206 pages.
1998b. "Variation, koïnèisation, créolisation : français d’Amérique et créoles", in P. Brasseur (éd.), Français d’Amérique. Variation, créolisation, normalisation, Avignon: Presses de l'Université d'Avignon, pp. 163–179.
2000. Grille d’analyse des situations linguistiques, Paris: Didier Erudition, 58 pages.
2001. (with Salikoko Mufwene), Creolization of language and culture, London: Routledge, 340 pages.
2003. La créolisation : théorie, applications, implications, Paris: L'Harmattan, 480 pages.
2010. la genèse des créoles de l'Océan indien, Paris: L'Harmattan.

References

External links
Chaudenson's web page 

Linguists from France
Academic staff of the University of Provence
Linguists of pidgins and creoles
Writers from Lyon
1937 births
2020 deaths
Deaths from the COVID-19 pandemic in France
20th-century linguists
21st-century linguists